Language in Thought and Action is a 1949 book on General Semantics by Samuel Ichiye Hayakawa, based on his previous work Language in Action (1939). Early editions were written in consultation with different people.  The 5th edition was published in 1991. It was updated by Hayakawa's son, Alan R. Hayakawa and has an introduction by Robert MacNeil. The book has sold over one million copies and has been translated into eight languages.

External links

1949 non-fiction books
Books in semantics
General semantics
Cognitive science literature
English-language books